Black Tower Studios is a Japanese game developer based in Tokyo and Australia. It was started by former Acquire creative director Richie Casper. Black Tower primarily creates action role-playing games for smartphones and tablets.

Black Tower co-developed their first full game for the PlayStation 3 with Aksys Games.

Games

References

External links
Joystiq Article
Pocket Gamer Article

Video game development companies
Video game companies of Japan
Video game companies established in 2012
Japanese companies established in 2012